The 2011–12 season is PAS Giannina F.C.'s 17th competitive season in the top flight of Greek football, 2nd season in the Superleague Greece, and 46th year in existence as a football club. They also compete in the Greek Cup.

Players 
Updated:-

International players

Foreign players

Personnel

Management

Coaching staff

Medical staff

Scouting

Academy

Transfers

Summer

In

Out 

For recent transfers, see List of Greek football transfers summer 2011

Winter

In

Out

Pre-season and friendlies

Competitions

Super League Greece

League table

Results summary

Fixtures

Greek cup

Fourth round

Fifth round

Statistics

Appearances 

Super League Greece

Goalscorers 

Super League Greece

Clean sheets

Disciplinary record

Best goal and MVP awards winners

References

External links 
 Official Website

PAS Giannina F.C. seasons
Greek football clubs 2011–12 season